Wilczyce  is a village in Sandomierz County, Świętokrzyskie Voivodeship, in south-central Poland. It is the seat of the gmina (administrative district) called Gmina Wilczyce.

The village has a population of 830.

References

Villages in Sandomierz County
Sandomierz Voivodeship
Radom Governorate
Kielce Voivodeship (1919–1939)